Irvington is a village in Washington County, Illinois, United States. The population was 659 at the 2010 census.

History
Irvington was named for Washington Irving.

Geography
Irvington is located at  (38.438536, -89.161220).

Demographics

As of the census of 2000, there were 736 people, 282 households, and 208 families residing in the village. The racial makeup of the village was 97.42% White, 0.41% African American, 0.41% Native American, 0.54% Asian, and 1.22% from two or more races. Hispanic or Latino of any race were 0.54% of the population.

There were 282 households, out of which 38.7% had children under the age of 18 living with them, 58.5% were married couples living together, 9.9% had a female householder with no husband present, and 26.2% were non-families. 21.6% of all households were made up of individuals, and 11.7% had someone living alone who was 65 years of age or older. The average household size was 2.61 and the average family size was 3.03.

In the village, the population was spread out, with 28.9% under the age of 18, 9.0% from 18 to 24, 27.9% from 25 to 44, 21.5% from 45 to 64, and 12.8% who were 65 years of age or older. The median age was 34 years. For every 100 females, there were 102.8 males. For every 100 females age 18 and over, there were 92.3 males.

The median income for a household in the village was $41,875, and the median income for a family was $51,250. Males had a median income of $37,422 versus $22,632 for females. The per capita income for the village was $16,541. About 7.5% of families and 9.0% of the population were below the poverty line, including 10.4% of those under age 18 and 6.9% of those age 65 or over.

Notable person
June C. Smith, Chief Justice of the Illinois Supreme Court, was born in Irvington.:

References

Villages in Illinois
Villages in Washington County, Illinois